Francesco Serafini (born 31 March 1990 in Guardiagrele) is an Italian football midfielder who last played for L'Aquila.

External links
 

1990 births
Living people
Sportspeople from the Province of Chieti
Italian footballers
L'Aquila Calcio 1927 players
Association football midfielders
Footballers from Abruzzo